The Kazakhstan national futsal team is controlled by the Football Federation of Kazakhstan, the governing body for futsal in Kazakhstan and represents the country in international futsal competitions, such as the World Cup and the European Championships.

Results and fixtures

The following is a list of match results in the last 12 months, as well as any future matches that have been scheduled.
Legend

2021

 Official Kazakhstan Results – KFF.kz
 Official Kazakhstan Fixtures – KFF.kz

Coaching staff

Current coaching staff

Manager history

(If statistics are unavailable, display former coaches in bulleted list form)

Team

Current squad
The following players were called up to the squad for the 2021 FIFA Futsal World Cup.

Competitive record

All-time record

Source:

FIFA Futsal World Cup

UEFA European Futsal Championship

AFC Futsal Asian Cup

Minor Tournament
this table consist of only senior A team Results (not include Youth and club match results)

Source:

2017 Thailand Fives Ranking

2016 Thailand Fives Ranking

2014 Tashkent Cup Ranking

Head-to-head record

References

External links
Kazakhstan national futsal team – official website at KFF.kz
UEFA UEFA.com
FIFA FIFA.com

Kazakhstan
futsal
Futsal in Kazakhstan